The Treaty of Adrianople of 1568 or Treaty of Edirne of 1568, was concluded in the Ottoman city of Adrianople (present-day Edirne), on 17 February 1568, by representatives of Holy Roman Emperor Maximilian II, ruler of Habsburg monarchy and Ottoman Sultan Selim II. It concluded the Austrian-Turkish War (1566-1568) and began a period of 25 years of relative peace between the empires. It followed the siege of Szigetvár, in which the Ottomans took a key Hungarian fortress, but at great cost, including the death of the previous Sultan, Suleiman the Magnificent.

Maximilian's ambassadors, Croatian Antun Vrančić and Styrian Christoph Teuffenbach, had arrived in Constantinople on 26 August 1567. Serious discussions with Sokollu Mehmed Pasha presumably began after the ambassadors' ceremonial audience with Selim II. After five months of negotiations, agreement was reached by 17 February 1568, and the Treaty of Adrianople was signed on 21 February that year, ending the war between the Habsburg monarchy and the Ottoman Empire. Maximilian agreed to pay an annual "present" of 30,000 ducats, and essentially granted the Ottomans authority in Transylvania, Moldavia, and Wallachia.

References

Bibliography 
 

Adrianople 1568
Adrianople
History of Edirne
1568 in the Ottoman Empire
Holy Roman Empire–Ottoman Empire relations
Treaties of the Holy Roman Empire
Eastern Hungarian Kingdom
Maximilian II, Holy Roman Emperor